Nikoloz Basilashvili (born 23 February 1992) is a Georgian professional tennis player. He reached a career-high ATP singles ranking of world No. 16 on 27 May 2019.

In July 2018, he made it into the main draw of the German Open in Hamburg as a qualifier and went on to win the tournament, defeating Leonardo Mayer in the final, thereby becoming the first Georgian player since Alex Metreveli to win an ATP tournament. In October 2018, Basilashvili won his second ATP title at the China Open by defeating world No. 4 Juan Martín del Potro in the final. In 2019, Basilashvili completed his first title defense by winning the German Open for a second successive year.

Personal life
Basilashvili was born 23 February 1992 in Tbilisi, Georgia. His father, Nodar, is a dancer of the Sukhishvili Georgian National Ballet, his mother, Natalia, worked as a physician. He has a brother, Tengiz. Apart from his native language he also speaks Russian and English.

Basilashvili started playing tennis at age 5. When he was 15 his family moved to Russia. From 2007 to 2011 he was coached in Sacramento, CA, United States and at 18 he returned to Georgia, only to uproot again and move to an academy in Turkey run by an Australian coach, Gavin Hopper. In 2011, Basilashvili announced that he may play for Russia, but decided to keep playing under the Georgian flag.

He has a son, Lukas who was born in 2015.

On 21 May, 2020, Basilashvili was arrested on a charge of physically assaulting ex-wife Neka Dorokashvili in front of their son. Dorokashvili elaborated at a later point, alleging that Basilashvili "declared her as a subordinate" and treated her in a derogatory way. Tblisi court released Basilashvili on a bail of 100,000 Georgian Lari (around $36,300 USD) after his first arrest, however he since attended a trial hearing remotely. His legal team denied the charges, stating that they were "false and completely unsubstantiated". Basilashvili was cleared of charges after court judge questioned why Dorokashvili did not come forward earlier and stated that all claims were either debunked or had no substantial evidence of having happened.

Junior career
Nikoloz did not play at any Grand Slams during his junior career. He reached a career high combined (singles and doubles) of world No. 59 on 5 January 2009. He ended his junior career with a 35–22 record on singles and 14–17 on doubles.

Basilashvili played in his first ITF Junior Circuit tournament in late 2006 at the G2 Jerry Simmons Tournament. He lost in the first qualifying round.
In 2007, he managed to break through the qualifying of two G4 tournaments in Israel and a G3 in Romania. Nikoloz lost in the Round of 16 in all of them. Later that year, he reached his first semifinal at any junior tournament doing that in doubles for the first time at the US Junior Hard Court Championships, partnering Patrick Daciek. In singles, he reached that round at the G4 USTA Illinois losing to Filip Krajinovic, in September.

In 2008, Nikoloz won his only junior title, the G4 Tennis Express tournament, defeating Raymond Sarmiento in three sets. The Georgian played mostly at G1 and GA tournaments that year, breaking through the qualifiers of the Eddie Herr Tennis Championship and the Orange Bowl. He reached the round of 16 in the former and the quarterfinals in the latter. The Orange Bowl was his last junior tournament.

Professional career

2015: Grand Slam debut
In 2015, he qualified for his first Grand Slam tournament – Roland Garros, losing in the first round to Thanasi Kokkinakis. He also managed to qualify for Wimbledon later that year, where he beat Facundo Bagnis and 15th seed Feliciano López, advancing to the third round of a major for the first time in his career. Additionally, he managed to qualify for the US Open, where he lost to Feliciano López in the first round in straight sets.

2016: First ATP final, Olympics debut
In 2016, he qualified for his first Australian Open, losing the first round in straight sets to Roger Federer. Later that same year, in July, Basilashvili reached his first ATP tournament final – the Austrian Open Kitzbühel, where he lost to Paolo Lorenzi in two sets. He recorded his first win over a Top 10 player in October when he defeated world number 10 Tomáš Berdych at the Vienna Open.

2017: Second ATP final
In February 2017, Basilashvili participated at the Sofia event, grabbing victories over Adrian Mannarino, 1st seed Dominic Thiem and 8th seed Martin Kližan, before losing to 3rd seed and eventual champion Grigor Dimitrov in the semifinals. Basilashvili continued his good form at the Memphis Open, where he defeated 1st seed Ivo Karlović and went on to subsequently reach the final, losing to Ryan Harrison in straight sets. In June 2017, Basilashvili achieved a then career-high singles ranking of World No. 51. He reached three semifinals and one final throughout the year. 
At the 2017 French Open, after defeating Gilles Simon and Viktor Troicki, Basilashvili lost to eventual champion Rafael Nadal in the third round, winning just one game in three sets. Afterwards, the defeat was described as "embarrassing".

2018: First ATP title and best career-high ranking by a Georgian player

In July 2018, he made it into the main draw of the German Open in Hamburg as a qualifier and went on to win the tournament, defeating Leonardo Mayer 6–4, 0–6, 7–5 in the final and becoming the first Georgian player to win an ATP tournament. After winning his first title, Basilashvili moved to World No. 35 in the world standings, his highest ever singles ranking and also the highest ever by a player from Georgia in the post-Soviet era. In October 2018, he won his second ATP title by upsetting top seed Juan Martín del Potro in the final of the China Open. In December in Doha, he lost to Novak Djokovic in three sets after beating Albert Ramos Viñolas and Andrey Rublev.

2019: Top 20 debut and career-high ranking, third ATP title 
In 2019, he lost in four sets to the later semifinalist Stefanos Tsitsipas at the Australian Open after beating two qualifiers in four and five sets. At the ATP 500 tournament in Rotterdam in February, as the 9th seed, he beat Hyeon Chung before losing to Márton Fucsovics. His performance earned him his career-high ranking of World No. 19.

He then played the 2019 Dubai Tennis Championships where he beat Karen Khachanov and Roberto Bautista Agut before falling to Borna Coric of Croatia. At the 2019 Indian Wells Masters he suffered an upset to Prajnesh Gunneswaran of India. At the 2019 Miami Open he reached the fourth of a Masters 1000 for the first time in his career where he was defeated by qualifier Felix Auger-Aliassime.

In July, Basilashvili successfully defended his Hamburg title, saving two match points against Alexander Zverev in the semifinal and beating Andrey Rublev in the final.

At the 2019 US Open he defeated Márton Fucsovics from Hungary in the first round and qualifier Jenson Brooksby in the second round before losing to another qualifier, the German Dominik Koepfer in the third.

2020: Loss of form, out of top 30
At the 2020 Australian Open, Basilashvili lost in the second round to Fernando Verdasco in 4 sets. At the 2020 US Open, he lost in the first round to John Millman.

He finished the year ranked No. 40 in singles.

2021: Fourth and fifth title, Olympics, maiden Masters final
Basilashvili started his 2021 season at the Antalya Open. Seeded sixth, he reached the quarterfinals where he lost to fourth seed, world No. 23, and eventual champion, Alex de Minaur. Seeded fifth at the Great Ocean Road Open, he was defeated in the second round by world No. 188 Mario Vilella Martínez. At the Australian Open, he was eliminated in the first round by American Tommy Paul.

In Montpellier, Basilashvili was beaten in the first round by French qualifier Grégoire Barrère. At the Rotterdam Open, he lost in the first round to qualifier Cameron Norrie. In Doha, he defeated John Millman and Malek Jaziri before stunning second seed and world no. 6, Roger Federer, in the quarterfinals. His semifinal win against Taylor Fritz in straight sets earned him his sixth ATP final against fifth seed Roberto Bautista Agut. He ended up beating Bautista Agut to win his fourth ATP singles title. At the Dubai Championships, he was defeated in the second round by 15th seed Taylor Fritz. Seeded 27th at the Miami Open, he was eliminated in the second round by Mikael Ymer.

Starting his clay-court season seeded fourth at the Sardegna Open, Basilashvili reached the semifinals where he fell to defending champion and eventual finalist, Laslo Đere. He retired during his first-round match against Filip Krajinović at the Monte-Carlo Masters due to injury. Competing in Barcelona, he was beaten in the first round by Jérémy Chardy. Seeded fifth at the BMW Open in Munich, he made it to the final beating Thiago Monteiro, qualifier Daniel Elahi Galán, lucky loser Norbert Gombos, and second seed Casper Ruud. He defeated 7th seed, Jan-Lennard Struff, in the championship match to lift his fifth ATP singles title. Playing in Madrid, he lost in round one to Benoît Paire. At the Italian Open, he was defeated in the first round by ninth seed Matteo Berrettini. Seeded third at the first edition of the Belgrade Open, he suffered a second round upset at the hands of qualifier Andrej Martin. Seeded 28th at the French Open, he was eliminated in the second round by qualifier Carlos Alcaraz.

Seeded fifth at the Stuttgart Open, his first grass-court tournament of the season, Basilashvili lost in the second round to eventual champion Marin Čilić. Getting past qualifying at the Halle Open, he reached the semifinals where he was defeated by fourth seed Andrey Rublev. Seeded 24th at Wimbledon, he was eliminated in the first round by two-time champion, Andy Murray, in four sets but won the third set after coming back from a 0–5 deficit to win the set 7–5.

Seeded third at the Hamburg Open, Basilashvili was beaten in the quarterfinals by Laslo Đere. Representing Georgia at the Summer Olympics, he lost in the third round to fourth seed and eventual gold medalist, Alexander Zverev.

Basilashvili began his preparation for the US Open at the National Bank Open in Toronto. He beat 12th seed, Alex de Minaur, in the second round. He was defeated in the third round by seventh seed Hubert Hurkacz. In Cincinnati, he was eliminated from the tournament in the first round by Fabio Fognini. At the US Open, he reached the third round where he was beaten by 22nd seed and American, Reilly Opelka.

Basilashvili achieved his best result at a Masters 1000 in Indian Wells by reaching the final, beating Christopher Eubanks, Albert Ramos-Viñolas, 24th seed Karen Khachanov, world no. 3 and second seed Stefanos Tsitsipas, and 31st seed Taylor Fritz. He became the first Georgian to reach the semifinals of a Masters 1000 since Irakli Labadze at the 2004 Indian Wells Masters. He lost in the final to 21st seed, Cameron Norrie, in three sets. With the final, he became just the second Georgian to reach a Masters 1000 final after Alex Metreveli at the 1968 Monte-Carlo Masters and the first to represent Georgia as an independent country.

2022: Doha finalist in consecutive years, Wimbledon third round, Match-fixing allegations
Basilashvili started his 2022 season by representing Georgia at the ATP Cup. Georgia was in Group D alongside Argentina, Poland, and Greece. Playing against Argentina, he lost to world No. 13 Diego Schwartzman. Against Greece, he retired during his match against world No. 4, Stefanos Tsitsipas, due to having breathing issues. In the end, Georgia ended fourth in Group D. Seeded second at the Sydney Classic, he was defeated in the second round by Andy Murray in three sets. Seeded 21st at the Australian Open, he lost in the first round to five-time finalist, Andy Murray, in five sets.

Seeded fourth at the Open Sud de France, Basilashvili was eliminated in the second round by qualifier Damir Džumhur. Seeded eighth in Rotterdam, he was beaten in the first round by Mackenzie McDonald. Seeded third and the defending champion at the Qatar ExxonMobil Open, he reached the final once again where he fell to second seed and world No. 16, Roberto Bautista Agut, in a rematch of the previous year's final. At the Dubai Championships, he was ousted from the tournament in the first round by lucky loser Alexei Popyrin. Seeded 18th and last year finalist at the Indian Wells Masters, he lost in the third round to 12th seed and defending champion, Cameron Norrie, in a rematch of last year's final. Seeded 18th at the Miami Open, he was defeated in the second round by American Jenson Brooksby.

Basilashvili began his clay-court season at the Monte-Carlo Masters. Seeded 15th, he retired during his first-round match against Grigor Dimitrov due to breathing issues and chest pain. Seeded ninth at the Barcelona Open, he lost in the second round to Spanish wildcard Jaume Munar. Seeded fourth and the defending champion at the BMW Open in Munich, he fell in the quarterfinals to seventh seed Miomir Kecmanović. In Madrid, he was beaten in the second round by seventh seed, world No. 9, and eventual champion, Carlos Alcaraz. At the Italian Open, he lost in the second round to 13th seed and world No. 16, Denis Shapovalov. Seeded fifth at the Geneva Open, he was defeated in the second round by eventual finalist João Sousa. Seeded 22nd at the French Open, he lost in the second round to Mackenzie McDonald.

Basilashvili started his grass-court season at the BOSS Open in Stuttgart. Seeded fifth, he lost in the second round to Nick Kyrgios. In Halle, he stunned third seed, world No. 8, and last year finalist, Andrey Rublev, in the first round. He was defeated in the second round by Oscar Otte. Having been a late entry at the Mallorca Championships, he was defeated in the first round of qualifying by world No. 346 Mats Rosenkranz. Seeded 22nd at Wimbledon, he reached the third round where he lost to Dutch wildcard Tim van Rijthoven.

After Wimbledon, Basilashvili competed at the Swedish Open. Seeded sixth, he retired during his first-round match against Hugo Gaston. Seeded sixth at the Hamburg Open, he was beaten in the first round by Aslan Karatsev.

In August, Basilashvili played at the Western & Southern Open in Cincinnati. He lost in the first round to Mackenzie McDonald. This was his third loss of the season to McDonald. Seeded sixth at the Winston-Salem Open, he lost in his second-round match to Thiago Monteiro. Seeded 31st at the US Open, he was eliminated from the tournament in the first round by qualifier Wu Yibing.

Seeded fifth at the Moselle Open, Basilashvili lost in the second round to Arthur Rinderknech. Seeded sixth at the Sofia Open, he was defeated in the first round by Fernando Verdasco. In Vienna, he was beaten in the first round by top seed, world No. 4, and eventual champion, Daniil Medvedev. At the Paris Masters, he lost in the second round to Lorenzo Musetti. Basilashvili played in his final tournament of the season at the Open International de Tennis de Roanne, an ATP Challenger. Seeded fifth, he reached the quarterfinals where he lost to second seed and eventual champion, Hugo Gaston, in three sets.

Basilashvili, his coach Yahor Yatsyk and fellow tennis player Aslan Karatsev were involved in allegations of match fixing.

He finished the year at No. 92 in the singles rankings.

2023: Loss of form, out of top 100
At the 2023 Qatar ExxonMobil Open where he was runner-up the previous year, he entered as lucky loser, but lost in the first round to French qualifier Alexandre Müller. As a result he fell out of the top 100 not being able to defend his points.

Performance timelines

Singles
Current through the 2022 Hamburg Open.

Significant finals

Masters 1000 finals

Singles: 1 (1 runner-up)

ATP career finals

Singles: 9 (5 titles, 4 runners-up)

ATP Challenger & ITF Futures finals

Singles: 20 (15 titles, 5 runner–ups)

Doubles: 6 (2 titles, 4 runner–ups)

Record against top 10 players
Basilashvili's record against players who have been ranked in the top 10, with those who are active in boldface. Only ATP Tour main draw matches are considered:

Wins over top 10 players
He has a  record against players who were, at the time the match was played, ranked in the top 10.

*

Davis Cup matches

References

External links
 
 
 

1992 births
Living people
Sportspeople from Tbilisi
Male tennis players from Georgia (country)
Olympic tennis players of Georgia (country)
Tennis players at the 2016 Summer Olympics
Tennis players at the 2020 Summer Olympics